{{Automatic taxobox 
| image = Apletodon incognitus.jpg
| image_caption = A. incognitus
| taxon = Apletodon
| authority = Briggs, 1955
| type_species = Lepadogaster microcephalus
| type_species_authority = Brook, 1890<ref name = CofF>{{Cof record|genid=6770|title=Apletodon|access-date=2 June 2019}}</ref>
}}Apletodon is a genus of marine fish in the family Gobiesocidae (clingfishes). The genus was first named by John Carmon Briggs in 1955.

Species
There are currently six recognized species in this genus:
 Apletodon bacescui (Murgoci, 1940)
 Apletodon barbatus R. Fricke, Wirtz & Brito, 2010 (Barbel clingfish)
 Apletodon dentatus (Facciolà, 1887) (Small-headed clingfish)
 Apletodon incognitus Hofrichter (de) & Patzner, 1997
 Apletodon pellegrini (Chabanaud, 1925) (Chubby clingfish)
 Apletodon wirtzi'' R. Fricke, 2007 (São Tomé clingfish)

References

External links

 
Taxa named by John Carmon Briggs
Gobiesocidae